Marilena Makri (born 18 November 2002) is a Cypriot sailor. She competed in the Laser Radial event at the 2020 Summer Olympics.

References

External links
 
 

2002 births
Living people
Cypriot female sailors (sport)
Olympic sailors of Cyprus
Sailors at the 2020 Summer Olympics – Laser Radial
Sportspeople from Limassol